This is a list of official state shells for those states of the United States that have chosen to select one as part of their state insignia. In 1965, North Carolina was the first state to designate an official state shell, the Scotch bonnet. Since then, 14 other states have designated an official state shell.

These are seashells, the shells of various marine mollusks including both gastropod and bivalves. Each one was chosen to represent a maritime state, based on the fact that the species occurs in that state and was considered suitable to represent the state, either because of the species' commercial importance as a local seafood item, or because of its beauty, rarity, exceptional size, or other features.

Table

See also
 List of U.S. state, district, and territorial insignia

References

External links

State
Shells